Calambrone is a village in Tuscany, central Italy, administratively a frazione of the comune of Pisa, province of Pisa.

Calambrone is about 25 km from the city of Pisa.

References

Bibliografia 
 
 
 

Frazioni of the Province of Pisa